Juliet Taylor is an American casting director.  Best known for her work with Woody Allen, she has cast more than 100 films over the course of her career.

Early life and education

Taylor grew up in Greenwich, Connecticut, and attended Miss Porter's School and Smith College, where she majored in drama.

Career
Taylor moved to New York following her graduation, and through a connection at Smith, she was hired as a receptionist for David Merrick, a theater producer. A year later she began working for casting director Marion Dougherty.  In 1973, Dougherty left casting to become a producer, and Taylor ran the company until 1977, when she was named director of east coast casting for Paramount Pictures  In 1978 she began to cast films independently.  Her first solo casting credit was for The Exorcist.
In 1979, in a feature story titled "The Casting Director,"  New York Magazine wrote: "It is commonly conceded within the film industry that Juliet Taylor is the best and by far the most important of the casting directors."

In addition to casting films including Taxi Driver, Sleepless in Seattle and Schindler's List, Taylor has cast 43 Woody Allen movies, beginning with 1975's Love and Death. He credits her with introducing him to Jeff Daniels, Mary Beth Hurt, Patricia Clarkson, Mariel Hemingway, Dianne Wiest, Meryl Streep, Joaquin Phoenix, and Parker Posey, among others.

Taylor was featured in the 2013 HBO documentary, Casting By.  She was awarded the Smith College Medal in 1990.

Awards and nominations

Emmy Awards

|-
| style="text-align:center;" | 2004||style="text-align:left;" | Angels in America|| Outstanding Casting for a Miniseries, Movie or a Special (with Ellen Lewis) || 
|-
| style="text-align:center;" rowspan="2"| 2001 ||style="text-align:left;" rowspan="2"| Wit||Outstanding Casting for a Miniseries, Movie or a Special (with Ellen Lewis, Leo Davis) ||
|}

Casting Society of America 

|-
| style="text-align:center;" |  2006 ||style="text-align:left;" |As casting director, 2006|| Golden Apple Award|| 
|-
| style="text-align:center;"| 1997 ||style="text-align:left | As casting director, 1997||Hoyt Bowers Award|| 
|-
| style="text-align:center;| 1995 ||style="text-align:left;" | Bullets Over Broadway||Best Casting for Feature Film, Comedy || 
|-
| style="text-align:center;" | 1994 ||style="text-align:left;" | Sleepless in Seattle || Best Casting for Feature Film, Comedy|| 
|-
| style="text-align:center; |1988 ||style="text-align:left;" | Mississippi Burning || Best Casting for Feature Film, Drama || 
|-
|style="text-align:left;" |1987 ||style="text-align:left;"| Hannah and Her Sisters || Best Casting for Feature Film, Comedy ||
|}

Gotham Independent Film

|-
| style="text-align:center;" |  1995 |||| Independent Film Tribute Award|| 
|-
|}

New York Women in Film

|-
| style="text-align:center;" |  1996 |||| Muse Award|| 
|-
|}

Women in Film Crystal Awards

|-
| style="text-align:center;" |  2001 |||| Crystal Award|| 
|-
|}

References

External links
 

American casting directors
Women casting directors
Smith College alumni
Miss Porter's School alumni
Emmy Award winners